Waldemar Scovino (6 December 1931 – 20 November 1963) was a Brazilian rower. He competed in the men's coxed four event at the 1960 Summer Olympics.

References

1931 births
1963 deaths
Brazilian male rowers
Olympic rowers of Brazil
Rowers at the 1960 Summer Olympics
Rowers from Rio de Janeiro (city)